Madampu Sankaran  Namboothiri (23 June 1941 − 11 May 2021), popularly known as Madampu Kunjukuttan, was a Malayalam actor, author and  screenplay writer.

Background and personal life
Kunjukuttan was born in Kiralur village of Thrissur District on 23 June 1941. He studied Sanskrit, Hasthyaayurvedam (treatment of elephants), worked as teacher for Sanskrit at Kodungalloor and was also a priest in a nearby temple. Madampu also worked for Ākāsha Vāṇī (All India Radio). He was married to Savithri Antharjanam and had two daughters, Jaseena Madampu and Haseena Madampu.

Career
His noted works  includes Aswathamavu, Mahaprasthanam, Avighnamasthu, Bhrashtu, Entharo Mahanubhavulu, Nishadam, Pathalam, Aryavarthanam, Amrithasya Puthrah and Thonnyasam. He also wrote screenplays for the movies 'Makalkku', 'Gourisankaram', 'Saphalam', 'Karunam' and 'Deshadanam'. Kunjukuttan's novel Mahaprasthanam won the Kerala Sahitya Akademi Award for Best Novel  in 1983. He won the National Film Award for Best Screenplay in the year 2000 for the Malayalam film Karunam, directed by Jayaraj. He contested in the Assembly election in 2001 from Kodungallur on a BJP ticket, but did not win. In 2003, he won the Ashdod International Film Award for Best Screenplay for the film Parinamam (The Change) directed by P.Venu. He received Sanjayan Award in 2014. He was famous for being the host of TV show E4 Elephant along with Sreekumar Arookutty on Kairali TV. He died on 11 May 2021, at a hospital in Thrissur, succumbing to COVID-19 related complications.

Filmography

 Shyamaragam (2020)
 Utyopyile Rajavu (2015)
 Chirakodinja Kinavukal (2015)
 Aattakatha (2013)
 Orma Mathram (2011)
 Adayalangal (2008)
 Veeralipattu (2007)
 Aanachandam (2006)
 Vadakkumnadhan (2006)
 Rasikan (2004)
 Agninakshatram (2004)
 Parinamam (The Change) (2003)
 Maargam (2003)
 Kattu Vannu Vilichappol (2001)
 Karunam (2000)
 Shantham (2000)
 Agnisakshi (1999)
 Purushardham (1986)
 Aaraam Thampuran (1997)
 Ashwathama (1978)

Television 
 E4 Elephant

References

External links

Madambu Kunjikkuttan at MSI

1941 births
2021 deaths
People from Thrissur district
Male actors from Kerala
Male actors in Malayalam cinema
Indian male film actors
Malayalam-language writers
Malayalam novelists
Malayalam short story writers
Recipients of the Kerala Sahitya Akademi Award
20th-century Indian male actors
21st-century Indian male actors
20th-century Indian short story writers
21st-century Indian short story writers
Indian male short story writers
Indian male novelists
Indian male screenwriters
20th-century Indian novelists
21st-century Indian novelists
Malayalam screenwriters
Novelists from Kerala
20th-century Indian dramatists and playwrights
21st-century Indian dramatists and playwrights
Screenwriters from Kerala
20th-century Indian male writers
21st-century Indian male writers
Best Original Screenplay National Film Award winners
Deaths from the COVID-19 pandemic in India